Crystal Mountain or Crystal Mountains may refer to:

Mountains
 Crystal Mountain (Alaska)
  Monte Cristallo, Italy

Mountain ranges 
 Crystal Range, a small group of mountains in California
 Crystal Mountains (Brazil), a mountain range located in Brazil
 Crystal Mountains (Africa), a mountain range located on the west coast of central Africa

Populated place 
 Crystal Mountain, Michigan, United States, a census-designated place

Ski areas 
 Crystal Mountain (Washington), a ski resort in Washington, United States
 Crystal Mountain (British Columbia), a day-use ski area near West Kelowna, British Columbia in Canada
 Crystal Mountain (Michigan), a four-star ski resort located near Thompsonville, in Benzie County, Michigan
 Crystal Mountain (Egypt), between Bahariya Oasis and Farafra Oasis, Egypt

Music
 "Crystal Mountain", a 1995 song by Death from their album Symbolic
 "Crystal Mountain", a 1982 song by Kenny G from his eponymous debut album Kenny G

Other 
 Crystal Mountains National Park, national park in northwestern Gabon
 Sierra Cristal National Park, a park in Cuba